Sicoli may refer to:

Piero Sicoli, Italian astronomer
Goriano Sicoli, town in Abruzzo, Italy